Sebastián Morales Mendoza (born 22 August 1994) is a Colombian diver. He competed in the men's 3 metre springboard at the 2016 Summer Olympics, where he reached the final round, finishing 12th out of 29 competitors.

He represented Colombia at the 2020 Summer Olympics.

Notes

References

External links
 
 
 

1994 births
Living people
Divers at the 2016 Summer Olympics
Colombian male divers
Olympic divers of Colombia
Central American and Caribbean Games gold medalists for Colombia
Central American and Caribbean Games silver medalists for Colombia
Competitors at the 2014 Central American and Caribbean Games
Divers at the 2015 Pan American Games
South American Games bronze medalists for Colombia
South American Games medalists in diving
Competitors at the 2014 South American Games
Competitors at the 2022 South American Games
Divers at the 2019 Pan American Games
Central American and Caribbean Games medalists in diving
Pan American Games competitors for Colombia
Divers at the 2020 Summer Olympics
20th-century Colombian people
21st-century Colombian people